"Cow demons and snake spirits" is a Chinese term used during the Cultural Revolution (1966-1976) to demonize perceived enemies. Tang dynasty poet Du Mu (803–852) coined the term in the preface of a poetry collection by Li He (791–817) to praise the fantastical elements in Li's poetry.

In the early 1960s, Mao Zedong, a huge admirer of Li, frequently used this term in speeches to refer to reactionary elements and "class enemies". In 1966, after Chen Boda (the leader of the Cultural Revolution Group) took over the newspaper and official government organ People's Daily, an editorial titled Sweep Away All Cow Demons and Snake Spirits published on June 1, 1966, called for a nationwide struggle against these elements. "Cow demons and snake spirits" became one of the most popular terms during the Cultural Revolution, a term used to denounce and dehumanize any "enemy", real or perceived. The exact definition of the term (like most things in the Cultural Revolution) was unclear and subject to arbitrary interpretation, but the major enemies of the Cultural Revolution were:

Five Black Categories - Landlords, rightists, rich farmers, counter revolutionaries, and "bad elements"
Capitalist roaders
Stinking Old Ninths (intellectuals)
Hanjian (traitors)

Once someone was labeled as a "cow demon", they were to become imprisoned in a cowshed, storehouse or dark room. Illegal prisons during the Cultural Revolution were called "cowsheds", and exiles to the countryside were sometimes called "down to cowsheds".

References

Cultural Revolution
Ideology of the Chinese Communist Party
Dysphemisms
Chinese words and phrases